300 Days At Sea is the eighth studio album by Bermudian singer-songwriter Heather Nova, released in 25 September 2011. It was recorded in her home studio on a small island in Bermuda in 2010. Nova recorded nineteen tracks although not all made the final album cut. The album was produced and recorded by Felix Tod and David Ayers using only solar power. The album was produced with support of a crowdfunding project.

The album went top 40 in five European countries on release, with reviews calling it Heather's best album since 'Oyster', and marked a return to the full band sound of the early albums. The first single was 'Higher Ground' which got more radio airplay than any Heather Nova song to date.

Track listing

Charts

References

2011 albums
Heather Nova albums